Idolator is the third album by the Japanese metal band Blood Stain Child. Idolator combines melodic death metal similar to the In Flames albums released before this album with electronic and industrial metal influences similar to Machinae Supremacy, particularly on "Nuclear Trance". "Embrace Me", has a piano section both at the beginning and at the end of the song. In 2006, the band signed to Dockyard1 and released the album in Europe on November 27, 2006. The album was released in the United States on July 17, 2007.

Original track listing

European release track list
 "Hyper Sonic" 4:41
 "Truth" – 3:17
 "Final Sky" – 4:03
 "Live Inside" – 3:27
 "Ag2o" – 3:40
 "Embrace Me" – 4:56
 "Trial Spiral" – 3:48
 "Void" – 4:21
 "Type-N" – 3:23
 "True Blue (Luna Sea cover)" – 3:36

Personnel
 Ryo – lead vocals, bass guitar
 Ryu – lead guitar
 Shiromasa – rhythm guitar
 Aki – keyboards, piano, synthesizers, programming, backing vocals
 Violator – drums

Release history

References

External links
 www.bloodstainchild.com
 www.dockyard1.com Label and Release Info

2005 albums
Blood Stain Child albums
Locomotive Music albums
Albums produced by Tue Madsen